Indigofera cordifolia, the heart-leaf indigo, is a species of flowering plant in the family Fabaceae. It is found from the Cape Verde Islands, across the Sahel to Oman, the Indian Subcontinent, Guangdong in China, and some of the islands of Indonesia, and it has been introduced to the Northern Territory of Australia. A glycophyte adapted to sandy soils, it is considered a weed in some situations, but can also improve crop yields due to its nitrogen-fixing ability.

References

cordifolia
Flora of Cape Verde
Flora of Mauritania
Flora of Mali
Flora of Niger
Flora of Egypt
Flora of Northeast Tropical Africa
Flora of Socotra
Flora of the Gulf States
Flora of Oman
Flora of Afghanistan
Flora of Pakistan
Flora of West Himalaya
Flora of India
Flora of the Laccadive Islands
Flora of Assam (region)
Flora of Myanmar
Flora of Java
Flora of the Lesser Sunda Islands
Flora of Southeast China
Plants described in 1821